Flemming Gert Nielsen, known simply as Flemming Nielsen, (24 February 1934 – 16 November 2018) was a Danish football player in the midfielder position, who won a silver medal with the Denmark national football team at the 1960 Summer Olympics. He played professionally for Italian club Atalanta BC and Scottish club Morton.

Born in Copenhagen, Nielsen played as an amateur for local clubs B 93 and AB. He made his debut for the amateur-only Danish national team in June 1954, and played five games and scored two goals at the 1960 Summer Olympics in Rome. He played his last national team game in October 1960, having played a total 26 games and scored four goals for Denmark, before turning professional. He signed a professional contract with Italian club Atalanta BC and played three seasons in Serie A for the club. He played a total 92 games and scored eight goals for Atalanta in the Serie A, and won the 1963 Coppa Italia with the club. He then moved on Greenock Morton in Scotland in 1964. He played 29 games and scored two goals in two seasons with Greenock. In 1966, he moved back to Denmark, where he ended his career for B 93 in 1967.

After ending his active career, Nielsen was a sports journalist for Aftenbladet, Politiken, and B.T., and wrote two books about football.

Bibliography
1986: "Fodboldkunstneren Michael Laudrup : rundt om en stjerne", Jori.
1998: "Sådan blev Superligaens førertrøje grøn : eventyret om, hvordan AB er vendt tilbage i toppen af dansk fodbold", SAV-Danmark.

References

External links
 Danish national team profile
 Haslund.info profile
Mogens Jacobsen, "75 år i dag: Fokus på bolden", Politiken, 24 February 2009.
Roberto Di Maggio, "Danish Players in Italy", RSSSF, 2 January 2005.
 
 

1934 births
2018 deaths
Footballers from Copenhagen
Danish men's footballers
Boldklubben af 1893 players
Akademisk Boldklub players
Atalanta B.C. players
Serie A players
Greenock Morton F.C. players
Denmark international footballers
Footballers at the 1960 Summer Olympics
Olympic footballers of Denmark
Olympic silver medalists for Denmark
Scottish Football League players
Danish expatriate men's footballers
Expatriate footballers in Scotland
Expatriate footballers in Italy
Danish sports journalists
Olympic medalists in football
Medalists at the 1960 Summer Olympics
Association football midfielders
Danish expatriate sportspeople in Scotland
Danish expatriate sportspeople in Italy